Holgate School could refer to a number of schools:

United Kingdom
Annie Holgate Infant and Nursery School, a primary school in Hucknall, near Nottingham
Annie Holgate Junior School, a primary school in Hucknall, near Nottingham
Archbishop Holgate's School, a CofE voluntary aided comprehensive school in York
Holgate Pre-school, a daycare centre in York
Holgate School, a defunct comprehensive school in Barnsley
Holgate School, now known as The Holgate Academy, in Hucknall near Nottingham

United States
Holgate High School, a public High School in Ohio